The Avon Cup is a defunct WTA Tour affiliated tennis tournament played from 1983 to 1986. It was held on Marco Island, Florida and played on outdoor clay courts from 1983 to 1984 and again in 1986 and on outdoor hard courts in 1985. The event was sponsored by Avon Products and BMW during its tenure and was known as the Tournament of Champions in its final year.

The only woman to win the singles event more than once was Bonnie Gadusek.

Past finals

Singles

Doubles

External links
 WTA Results Archive

 
Clay court tennis tournaments
Hard court tennis tournaments
Defunct tennis tournaments in the United States
WTA Tour
1983 establishments in Florida
1986 disestablishments in Florida
Collier County, Florida
Recurring sporting events established in 1983
Recurring sporting events disestablished in 1986